Mirosavci is a village in the municipalities of Lopare (Republika Srpska) and Čelić, Tuzla Canton, Bosnia and Herzegovina.

Demographics 
According to the 2013 census, its population was 338, with 300 of them living in the Lopare part, and 38 in Čelić.

References

Populated places in Lopare
Populated places in Čelić